"Lose You to Love Me" is a song by American singer Selena Gomez, released by Interscope Records on October 23, 2019, as the lead single from Gomez's third studio album, Rare (2020). The song was written by Gomez, Julia Michaels, Justin Tranter, and its producers Mattman & Robin. "Lose You to Love Me" is a pop ballad with empowering lyrics about discovering one's true self, backed by a choir, piano and strings. The song is the fourth track on the standard edition of Rare, and the second on the deluxe edition.

"Lose You to Love Me" received acclaim from music critics, who mostly complimented its lyrical content. "Lose You to Love Me" topped the Billboard Hot 100, becoming Gomez's first number one song on the chart. Outside of the United States, "Lose You to Love Me" topped the charts in Canada and the Republic of Ireland, and peaked within the top ten of the charts in many countries, including Australia, Belgium, Germany, Malaysia, the Netherlands, New Zealand, Norway, Singapore, Sweden, Switzerland, and the United Kingdom. The song has attained several gold, platinum and multi-platinum certifications worldwide.

The accompanying music video premiered on YouTube coinciding with the song's release. It is a simplistic black-and-white video directed by Sophie Muller and filmed entirely on an iPhone 11 Pro in Los Angeles. It features Gomez singing straight to the camera, in a confessional. Gomez made the debut performance of the song at the 2019 American Music Awards on November 24, 2019. "Lose You to Love Me" was listed as one of the best songs of 2019 by Vulture and Billboard.

A demo version of the song was released on October 2, 2020, to celebrate the song's first anniversary. The song was featured in the TV series Hacks, as well as in 2021 Amazon Prime Video movie Encounter.

Background 
Gomez revealed in April 2019 that she was working on new music. After teasing her fans on Instagram with pictures of her as a child and now, she announced on October 18, that a single titled "Lose You to Love Me" would be released on October 23. In an interview with Zane Lowe on his Beats1 Radio show, co-writer Julia Michaels revealed that the song was written on Valentine's Day of 2019. In the documentary Selena Gomez: My Mind & Me, Gomez revealed the song was written in 45 minutes making it the fastest song of hers ever to be written.

Composition and lyrical interpretation 
"Lose You to Love Me" is a pop ballad and self-love anthem about discovering someone's true self through the difficult process of losing a lover. Chris Monlanpy from Slate stated "with only piano and Gomez's voice, then grows ever more stirring with plucked strings, a choir of backing vocals, and, more than halfway through, a subtle heartbeat thump that's the closest thing to a beat in the whole song."

Commercial performance 
The song debuted at number 15 on the US Billboard Hot 100 with 36,000 copies sold in its opening week after just two days of tracking. It debuted at number one on the Digital Songs chart and number 20 on the Streaming Songs chart. The song's number fifteen debut is also Gomez's second best debut on the Hot 100 chart after "Good for You" debuted at number nine in 2015. In its second week, the song ascended to number one, becoming Gomez's first number-one song on the Hot 100 and her highest-charting single in the US, surpassing the number five peaks of "Good for You" and "Same Old Love". It also became her eighth top ten hit on the chart. The song led Billboard's Streaming Songs chart, accumulating 38 million US streams in one week. It also became the best-selling song of the week digitally, topping Billboard's Digital Songs chart.

In the United Kingdom, "Lose You to Love Me" debuted at number 65 on the UK Singles Chart on October 25, 2019 – for the week ending date October 31, 2019 – climbing to its peak position of number three on the chart the following week, becoming Gomez's highest charting position in Britain.

In the Republic of Ireland, "Lose You to Love Me" peaked at the top the Irish Singles Chart, becoming Gomez's first number one song in the Irish Republic.

Music video 
The black-and-white music video was directed by Sophie Muller and filmed entirely on an iPhone 11 Pro in Los Angeles. It features Gomez singing straight to the camera, in a confessional. The video premiered on YouTube on October 22, 2019, coinciding with the song's release. The video has since amassed over 370 million views and 8 Million Likes.
On January 14, 2020, an alternative music video was released on her YouTube channel, as well as an alternative music video for "Look at Her Now".

Live performances 
Gomez first performed the song as the opening number of the 2019 American Music Awards on November 24, 2019, along with "Look at Her Now".

Critical reception 
"Lose You to Love Me" received acclaim from music critics. Writing for Vogue, Michelle Ruiz commended the song, stating, "Potentially getting lost in the internet sleuthing of it all, however, is the fact that "Lose You to Love Me" is a highly catchy and searing ballad that deserves to immediately be added to everyone's Empowering Breakup Songs playlist, right after Lizzo's 'Truth Hurts'." Craig Jenkins of Vulture praised its lyrics, noting: "It was a gamble trusting that the lyrics to this song would sell it on their own, but it was a wise one." Vulture also named it the second best song of 2019.

Awards and nominations

Track listing 

 Digital download

 "Lose You to Love Me" – 3:26

 Digital download (Demo Version)

 "Lose You to Love Me" (Demo Version) – 3:39

Credits and personnel 
Credits adapted from the liner notes of Rare.

Recording locations 
 Assisted at Westlake Recording Studios (Los Angeles) and Interscope Studios (Santa Monica, California)
 Mixed at MixStar Studios (Virginia Beach, Virginia)
 Demo tracked at MXM Studios (Los Angeles)
 Recorded and tracked at Costa Mesa Recording Studios (Newport, California), Interscope Studios (Santa Monica, California), Westlake Recording Studios (Los Angeles, California), Chalice Recording Studios (Los Angeles, California), MXM Studios (Los Angeles) and House Mouse Studios (Stockholm)
 Strings recorded and edited at The Calm Studio (Jonstorp, Sweden)
 Mastered at Sterling Sound (Edgewater, New Jersey)

Personnel 

 Selena Gomez – vocals, songwriter
 Julia Michaels – songwriter, backing vocals, choir vocals
 Justin Tranter – songwriter, backing vocals, choir vocals
 Mattman & Robin – songwriter, producer, vocal producer, backing vocals, choir vocals, bass guitar, organ, percussion, piano, strings, synthesizer programming
 Finneas O'Connell – additional producer
 Mattias Bylund – string arranger, recorder and editor, strings
 Mattias Johansson – violin
 David Bukovinszky – cello
 Bart Schoudel – engineer, vocal producer
 Ryan Dulude – assistant recording engineer
 Gavin Finn – assistant recording engineer
 Chris Gehringer – mastering engineer
 John Hanes – mix engineer
 Serban Ghenea – mixer
 Chris Gehringer – mastering
 Will Quinnell – mastering

Charts

Weekly charts

Year-end charts

Certifications and sales

Release history

See also 

 List of Billboard Hot 100 number-one singles of 2019
 List of number-one Billboard Streaming Songs of 2019
 List of Rolling Stone Top 100 number-one songs of 2019
 List of number-one digital songs of 2019 (U.S.)
 List of Canadian Hot 100 number-one singles of 2019
 List of number-one digital songs of 2019 (Canada)
 List of top 10 singles in 2019 (Australia)
 List of UK top-ten singles in 2019
 List of number-one singles of 2019 (Ireland)

References 

2010s ballads
2019 singles
2019 songs
Billboard Hot 100 number-one singles
Black-and-white music videos
Canadian Hot 100 number-one singles
Irish Singles Chart number-one singles
Interscope Records singles
Music videos directed by Sophie Muller
Pop ballads
Selena Gomez songs
Song recordings produced by Mattman & Robin
Song recordings produced by Finneas O'Connell
Songs written by Julia Michaels
Songs written by Justin Tranter
Songs written by Mattias Larsson
Songs written by Robin Fredriksson
Songs written by Selena Gomez